Spongicolidae is a family of glass sponge shrimps in the order Decapoda. There are about 8 genera and more than 40 described species in Spongicolidae.

Genera
These eight genera belong to the family Spongicolidae:
 Engystenopus Alcock & Anderson, 1894
 Globospongicola Komai & Saito, 2006
 Microprosthema Stimpson, 1860
 Paraspongicola de Saint Laurent & Cleva, 1981
 Spongicola de Haan, 1844
 Spongicoloides Hansen, 1908
 Spongiocaris Bruce & Baba, 1973
 † Jilinicaris Schram, Shen, Vonk & Taylor, 2000

References

Further reading

 
 
 

Decapods
Decapod families